The Minister for Rural and Community Development (Irish: An tAire Forbartha Tuaithe agus Pobail) is a senior minister in the Government of Ireland and leads the Department of Rural and Community Development.

The current Minister for Rural and Community Development is Heather Humphreys, TD. She is also Minister for Social Protection.

She is assisted by Joe O'Brien, TD – Minister of State for Community Development and Charities.

List of office-holders

Notes

References

Government ministers of the Republic of Ireland
Lists of government ministers of Ireland
Ireland, Rural and Community Development
Department of Rural and Community Development